Harry Russell Hopton (February 18, 1900 – April 7, 1945) was an American film actor and director.

Biography
Hopton was born in New York City, New York. He appeared in 110 films between 1926 and 1945, often playing streetwise characters from the city. Hopton directed the films Song of the Trail (1936) and Black Gold (1936). He died of an overdose of sleeping pills in North Hollywood, California. He is buried at Holy Cross Cemetery in Culver City.

Selected filmography

Ella Cinders (1926) - Studio Actor (uncredited)
Call of the Flesh (1930) - Captain Enrique Vargas
College Lovers (1930) - Eddie Smith
Remote Control (1930) - Frank
Min and Bill (1930) - Alec Johnson
New Moon (1930) - Dimitri (uncredited)
The Criminal Code (1930) - State's Attorney (uncredited)
 Desert Vengeance (1931) - Inspector (uncredited)
Dance, Fools, Dance (1931) - Whitey
The Miracle Woman (1931) - Bill Welford
The Star Witness (1931) - Deputy Thorpe
Street Scene (1931) - Steve Sankey
Reckless Living (1931) - Kid Regan
Blonde Crazy (1931) - Jerry (uncredited)
Arrowsmith (1931) - Terry Wickett
Discarded Lovers (1932) - Bob Adair
The Drifter (1932) - Montana
Dance Team (1932) - Roseland Master of Ceremonies (uncredited)
The Man Who Played God (1932) - Reporter (uncredited)
Law and Order (1932) - Luther Johnson
The Big Timer (1932) - Sullivan
Steady Company (1932) - Joe (uncredited)
Scandal for Sale (1932) - Sympathetic Juror (uncredited)
Night World (1932) - Klauss
The Famous Ferguson Case (1932) - Rusty Callahan
Radio Patrol (1932) - Pat Bourke
Fast Companions (1932) - Crooked Owner
Tom Brown of Culver (1932) - American Legion Doctor
Back Street (1932) - Reporter (uncredited)
Once in a Lifetime (1932) - Jerome 'Jerry' Hyland
Air Mail (1932) - 'Dizzy' Wilkins
Destination Unknown (1933) - Georgie
The Little Giant (1933) - Al Daniels
Elmer, the Great (1933) - Whitey
Secret of the Blue Room (1933) - Max, the chauffeur
One Year Later (1933) - Tony Richards
Curtain at Eight (1933) - Terry Mooney - Reporter
I'm No Angel (1933) - The Barker
Lady Killer (1933) - Smiley
Good Dame (1934) - 'Spats' Edwards
School for Girls (1934) - Elliott Robbins, aka Buck Kreegar
Men in White (1934) - Dr. Pete Bradley
He Was Her Man (1934) - Monk
Born to Be Bad (1934) - Steve Karns
Half a Sinner (1934) - 'Slim' Sullivan
Back Page (1934) - Brice Regal
The Girl from Missouri (1934) - Bert (scenes deleted)
Take the Stand (1934) - Bill Hamilton
Desirable (1934) - Chet
A Successful Failure (1934) - Phil Stardon
I Sell Anything (1934) - 'Smiley'
The World Accuses (1934) - Hugh Collins
Northern Frontier (1935) - Duke Milford
Wings in the Dark (1935) - Jake Brashear
Car 99 (1935) - Dispatch Operator Harper
Times Square Lady (1935) - Ed Brennan
Star of Midnight (1935) - Tommy Tennant
G Men (1935) - Gerard
Circus Shadows (1935) - A Dip
The Headline Woman (1935) - Craig
Death from a Distance (1935) - Det. Lt. Ted Mallory
Cheers of the Crowd (1935) - Lee Adams
Charlie Chan in Shanghai (1935) - 'G' Man (uncredited)
Valley of Wanted Men (1935) - Kelly Dillon
False Pretenses (1935) - Pat Brennan
Frisco Waterfront (1935) - Eddie
Rose of the Rancho (1936) - Frisco
Black Gold (1936) - Joe (uncredited)
Sutter's Gold (1936) - Crazed Sailor (uncredited)
Boulder Dam (1936) - Cable Operatior (uncredited)
Below the Deadline (1936) - Terry Mulvaney
The Last Outlaw (1936) - Sheriff Arthur Billings
A Son Comes Home (1936) - Reporter (uncredited)
With Love and Kisses (1936) - Flash Henderson
Beware of Ladies (1936) - Randy Randall
 Song of the Trail (1936)
We Who Are About to Die (1937) - 'Mac' MacAndrews
Angel's Holiday (1937) - Gus
High, Wide, and Handsome (1937) - John Thompson (uncredited)
One Mile from Heaven (1937) - Peter Brindell
Bad Guy (1937) - Charlie Edwards - Gambler (uncredited)
Big City (1937) - Buddy - Beecher's Cohort (uncredited)
Idol of the Crowds (1937) - Kelly
Letter of Introduction (1938) - Process Server (uncredited)
Crime Takes a Holiday (1938) - Jerry Clayton
Tarnished Angel (1938) - Lou (uncredited)
Made for Each Other (1939) - Collins (uncredited)
The Saint Strikes Back (1939) - Harry Donnell
Some Like It Hot (1939) - Barker (uncredited)
Renegade Trail (1939) - Bob Smoky Joslin
Mutiny in the Big House (1939) - Convict Frankie
Torture Ship (1939) - Harry 'The Carver' Bogard
Women Without Names (1940) - Police Broadcaster (uncredited)
Son of the Navy (1940) - Police Officer (uncredited)
On the Spot (1940) - Dave Nolan
Argentine Nights (1940) - Irate Passenger (uncredited)
The Quarterback (1940) - Man in Car with Bill (uncredited)
A Night of Adventure (1944) - Benny Sarto
Youth Runs Wild (1944) - Dickens (uncredited)
The Master Race (1944) - Porto (uncredited)
Tall in the Saddle (1944) - Wagon Driver (uncredited)
Heavenly Days (1944) - Remorse - News Photographer (uncredited)
Nevada (1944) - Henchman (uncredited)
What a Blonde (1945) - Bothered Train Passenger (uncredited)
Betrayal from the East (1945) - (uncredited)
Zombies on Broadway (1945) - Benny
West of the Pecos (1945) - Jeff Slinger
Johnny Angel (1945) - Reporter (uncredited)

References

External links

1900 births
1945 suicides
Burials at Holy Cross Cemetery, Culver City
20th-century American male actors
American male film actors
Male actors from New York (state)
Drug-related suicides in California
1945 deaths